Ricardo Bofill Taller de Arquitectura (RBTA) is an architecture firm that was founded in 1963 by Ricardo Bofill, initially as Taller de Arquitectura. It is headquartered in Sant Just Desvern near Barcelona, in a former cement factory known as La Fábrica.

History

Ricardo Bofill, then 23 years old, founded the Taller de Arquitectura in 1963 by with the encouragement and support of his father, the architect and builder Emilio Bofill. From the start, Bofill had the vision of a multidisciplinary team that would bring together architects, engineers, planners, sociologist, writers, movie makers and philosophers to generate original design ideas with a social and political purpose. Initial members of the team included Bofill's relatives and childhood friends such as Anna Bofill, Xavier Bagué and Ramón Collado; writer José Agustín Goytisolo; actress Serena Vergano; and visionary polymath , a former fellow activist of Bofill within the clandestine Unified Socialist Party of Catalonia. They were joined in 1966 by Peter Hodgkinson, in 1971 by writer , and in 1976 by architect Jean-Pierre Carniaux.

At the very beginning, the Taller was hosted in the offices of Emilio Bofill's firm in the Banco de Vizcaya building on Plaça de Catalunya 5, then moved to a temporary location on Calle de Calvet, then in 1965 to the new building designed by the Taller on Calle Nicaragua 99. It moved to La Fábrica in 1975.

From 1971 the Taller shifted its focus to France, and worked on prominent projects in state-sponsored new urban centers (villes nouvelles). In 1991, the Paris office moved into a purpose-built space at 18, rue d'Enghien, in the former seat of newspaper ; it eventually closed in 2000. The Taller also maintained an office in New York City (on 394 West Broadway) from 1987 to the early 1990s, and other offshoots at various times in Montpellier, Tokyo, Chicago, and Beijing.

In the late 1970s, the Taller de Arquitectura collaborated with the Algerian government on urban planning and housing-related issues, culminating in the creation of an experimental new agricultural village at Méchraâ Houari Boumédienne near Abadla, Bechar Province.

Stylistic evolution

With much simplification, the design style of RBTA can be described as having gone through four phases: the geometrical combinations of the early projects in the 1960s and early 1970s, inspired by Utopian socialism, vernacular architecture and critical regionalism; from the late 1970s, a turn towards ostensibly classical forms associated with large-scale utilization of precast concrete; from the late 1980s to the 2000s, a gradual distillation of that classical inspiration into a more abstract vocabulary that still referred to formal geometries and increasingly used steel and glass as its prominent materials; and in the 2010s, a partial return to vernacular inspiration, particularly in projects in the Muslim world such as Mohammed VI Polytechnic University in Morocco.

As noted by Peter Hodgkinson in a video presenting the Taller'''s work in 1981, the group's building approach went from one extreme to the other in the space of two decades: from a strong emphasis on artisanal craftsmanship in the early 1960s, to large-scale heavy industrialization using precast concrete in the early 1980s. In the latter period, a division of labor existed between the two offices of Barcelona and Paris, with design functions centered in the former and industrialization and project execution in the latter, led at the time by Ramón Collado.

The pivot towards classicism has arguably been the most debated of these successive shifts. Critic Geoffrey Broadbent wrote in 1981 about RBTA's recent work: "The point, of course, is that having shocked people once [with the geometrical plays of the Taller's early period], if you want to keep shocking them, the most outrageous thing you can do, as an avant-garde artist, is to go back to the Classical!" According to Peter Hodgkinson, the influence of Charles Jencks played a role in prompting the Tallers Classicist turn in the late 1970s.

In a noted study of France's evolving social structures and landscapes published in 2021, political scientist Jérôme Fourquet and journalist Jean-Laurent Cassely wrote that "the monumental projects designed by Spanish architect Ricardo-Bofill in Noisy-le-Grand (Les Espaces d'Abraxas), in Saint-Quentin-en-Yvelines (Les Arcades du Lac) and in Montpellier (the Antigone neighborhood) are basically the architectural signature of the 1980s" in the country.

Selected projects

Urban design and landscaping

 Manzanares Park, Madrid. Completed 2003
 Antigone neighborhood, Montpellier, France. Completed 1999
 Kirchberg, Luxembourg. Master plan, 1998
 Turia Gardens, Valencia. Completed 1988
 Agricultural Village Houari Boumédienne, Algeria. Completed 1980
 Le Perthus Pyramid, Spanish-French border. Completed 1976

Transport and government infrastructure

 T1 at Barcelona Airport. Completed 2009
 Maritime Station, Savona, Italy. Completed 2003
 Extension of Málaga Airport. Completed 2000
 Extension of Barcelona Airport, now Terminal 2. Completed 1992
 Headquarters of Languedoc-Roussillon Regional Government, Montpellier. Completed 1988

Commercial

 W Barcelona Hotel. Completed 2010
 Lazona Kawasaki Plaza, Kawasaki, Japan. Completed 2006
 Shiseido Building, Tokyo, Japan. Completed 2001
 Madrid Congress Center. Completed 1993
 Domaine Chateau Lafite-Rothschild, Pauillac, France. Completed 1986

Offices

 Citadel Center, Chicago, US. Completed 2003
 Casablanca Twin Center, Casablanca. Completed 1998
 Marché Saint-Honoré, Paris. Completed 1997
 77 West Wacker Drive, Chicago. Completed 1992
 SWIFT Headquarters, La Hulpe, Belgium. Completed 1989

Culture and sports infrastructure

 Mohammed VI Polytechnic University, Benguerir, Morocco. First phase completed 2014
 Teatre Nacional de Catalunya, Barcelona. Completed 1997
 Shepherd School of Music, Houston. Completed in 1991
 Arsenal de Metz, France. Completed 1989
 Sanctuary of Meritxell, Andorra. Completed 1977

Housing

 Platinum Tower, Beirut (with Nabil Gholam). Completed 2008
 Pa Soder Crescent known as Bofills båge, Stockholm. Completed 1992
 Les Échelles du Baroque, Paris. Completed 1985
 Les Espaces d'Abraxas, Marne-la-Vallée, France. Completed 1982
 Les Arcades du Lac, St. Quentin en Yvelines, France. Completed 1981
 Walden 7, Sant Just Desvern, Spain. Completed 1974
 La Muralla Roja, Calpe, Spain. Completed 1973
 Barrio Gaudi, Reus, Spain. Completed 1970

Selected exhibitions

Taller de Arquitectura, Centro de Arte y de Cultura, Buenos Aires, 1976
La Strada Novissima, Biennale, Venice, 1980	
Ricardo Bofill Taller de Arquitectura, Architectural Association, London, 1981	
Projets Français 1971-1981 La Cité: Histoire et Technologie, École nationale supérieure des Beaux-Arts, Paris, 1981	
Présence de l’Histoire, Chapelle de la Salpêtrière, Paris, 1981.
The Presence of the Past, The International Architecture Exhibition from the Venice Biennale, Fort Mason Center, San Francisco, 1982	
El Jardí del Turia, Lonja, Valencia, 1982	
Modern Islamic Architecture, Biennale, Venice, 1982	
El Jardí del Turia : Metamorfosi della Cittá tra Cultura e Natura, Un esempio Spagnolo, Palazzo Braschi, Rome, 1983	
Follies: Architecture for the Late XXth Century Landscape, Leo Castelli Gallery, New York, 1983
Architecture et Industrie. Passé et avenir d’un mariage de raison, Centre Pompidou, Paris, 1984	
Image et Imaginaire de l’Architecture, Centre Pompidou, Paris, 1984	
Les Places d’EuropeHistoire et Actualité d’un Espace Public, Centre Pompidou, Paris, 1984	
Arquitectura de Tierra, Lonja, Valencia, 1984
Primera Semana de Video y Arquitectura, Ministerio de Obras Públicas y Urbanismo, Madrid, 1984
Follies, Ministerio de Obras Públicas y Urbanismo, Madrid, 1984
Follies: Architecture for the Late XXth Century Landscape, J. Corcoran Gallery, Los Angeles, New York NY, 1984
Spaanse Kunst 1984, Nouvelles Images Gallery, The Hague, 1984
Architecture Espagnole (Années 3080), Europalia, Brussels, 1985	
Ricardo Bofill and Leon Krier, Architecture, Urbanism and History. Museum of Modern Art, New York. 1985
R.B. Taller de Arquitectura, Stichting de Beurs Van Berlage, Amsterdam, 1989	
R.B.Taller de Arquitectura, Musée d’Ixelles, Brussels, 1989	
Catalan Art in New York (Design & Arts & Fashion), Armory, New York, 1990	
Urban Furniture, Rotterdamse Kunst Stichting, Rotterdam, 1989
Barcelona the city and the ‘92, Biennale, Venice, 1992
Ricardo Bofill Taller de Arquitectura: MemoryFuture, Athaeneum, Chicago, 1992
Architecture & Sacred Space in modernity, Biennale, Venice, 1992
Ricardo Bofill Taller de Arquitectura, Guangzhou, 1993	
Le Architetture dello spazio pubblico, Barcelona Airport, Triennale, Milan, 1997–99.
Ricardo Bofill Taller de Arquitectura, Projectos e edifícios. Museu Casa da Luz, Funchal, Madeira, 2001
Ricardo Bofill Taller de Arquitectura, European Cultural Centre, Palazzo Bembo, Venice, 2014

References

1963 establishments in Spain
Architecture firms of Spain
Postmodern architecture
Urban design